Naruto video games have appeared for various consoles from Nintendo, Sony and Microsoft, based on Masashi Kishimoto's manga and anime. Most of them are fighting games in which the player directly controls one of a roster of various characters as featured in the series' Parts I and II. The player pits their character against another character controlled by the game's AI or by another player, depending on the mode the player is in. The objective is to reduce the opponent's health to zero using basic attacks and special techniques unique to each character derived from techniques they use in the Naruto anime or manga. The first Naruto video game was Naruto: Konoha Ninpōchō, which was released in Japan on March 27, 2003, for the WonderSwan Color. Most Naruto video games have been released only in Japan. The first games released outside Japan were the Naruto: Gekitou Ninja Taisen series and the Naruto: Saikyou Ninja Daikesshu series, released in North America under the titles of Naruto: Clash of Ninja and Naruto: Ninja Council.

, the Ultimate Ninja series had sold  copies worldwide.

Series

Naruto: Clash of Ninja

The Naruto: Clash of Ninja series (known in Japan as Naruto: Gekitō Ninja Taisen) is a series of video games developed by Eighting and published by D3 Publisher and Takara Tomy.

Naruto: Ninja Council

Naruto: Ninja Destiny

Naruto: Path of the Ninja

Naruto: Uzumaki Chronicles

Naruto: Ultimate Ninja

Arcade games

Other games

}}

Related games

References

External links
Official Site for Namco Bandai Naruto games
Official Site for Tomy Naruto games
Official Site for Xbox 360 games (Ubisoft)

Naruto video game series)
Naruto (video game series)
 

Naruto
Video games